Providencia and Santa Catalina Islands (Spanish: Providencia y Santa Catalina Islas) is a municipality of the department of Archipelago of San Andrés, Providencia and Santa Catalina in insular Colombian region, on the northern coast of Providencia Island as well as several uninhabited cayes to the North and East) had a population of 5,011 at the 2007 official estimates, and receives just 15,000 visitors per year. The island is one of Colombia's top scuba diving destinations, with a 32 km long barrier reef protecting the Eastern coast of the island (see photo to the right).

Geography 

This is the main island of the Providencia group, and the second largest of the department. Providencia Island and Santa Catalina Island (a small satellite island close off its northern end) extend 7.2 km in a north-south direction. The land area of Providencia Island measures 17 km². The mountainous center of Providencia Island rises to three peaks of about the same elevation: roughly 363 meters. The island consists of sedimentary rocks laid down on a former volcano. The chief settlement is Santa Isabel Village aka 'Town' in the north, near Santa Catalina Island. Other villages are Lazy Hill on the west coast, and Bottom House in the southeast.

History
The Miskito from the mainland first came into contact with the English when the Second Earl of Warwick established his colony on Providence Island in 1639. The Earl persuaded the Miskito leader to send his son to England as an emissary. This prince, known to his descendants as Oldman (or Oldham in old documents), was received in by King Charles I, who gave him noble title. He later returned to the Mosquito Coast to find that his father had died during his absence, and that he was now king. His son and successor, Jeremy, visited Jamaica in February 1688 and placed himself and his people under English protection as a result of Spanish aggression. Thereafter, all his successors were confirmed king by virtue of a certificate of recognition from the Governor of Jamaica.
 
In the years that followed, small numbers of English and American settlers, escaped convicts and slaves, settled in several centres along the coast, many of them intermarrying with the local tribes of Indians. They left offspring who took part in the military and administrative affairs of the Miskito kingdom. Relations between the Miskito and the Spanish had always been poor, and the increasing number of settlers increased tensions further. British commercial interest in hardwood logging in nearby Honduras also exacerbated Spanish antagonism and apprehensions. As a result, official British involvement in the region steadily increased. Miskito king Edward I and the British concluded a formal Treaty of Friendship and Alliance in 1740, followed by the appointment of a British Superintendent in 1749. His brief tenure included the establishment of a more formal protectorate over the Miskito nation, giving advice to the king, codifying the islands legal system, and formalising a system of land grants.

Demographics
The local population consists of Raizals, a Protestant Afro-Caribbean ethnic group, speaking the San Andrés–Providencia Creole, an English Creole, although most speak Spanish as well. Spanish-speaking immigrants from Colombia have increased the use of Spanish, although they remain a minority, unlike the significantly more Spanish sister island, San Andrés.
  
A forum titled "San Andres & Providencia" Islands of Colombia reads “…This heritage goes back to pre-colonial times, to the days of the Dutch sea captains who inhabited San Andres and Old Providence, one of whom founded Bluefields, naming it after himself…”

Transport
The local El Embrujo Airport is served by various daily flights from Gustavo Rojas Pinilla International Airport in San Andrés. Scheduled flights are operated by Satena, and charter flights by Decameron/Searca.

A 50-seat catamaran makes the two and a half hour return trip from San Andres to Providencia Island four times a week, leaving San Andres in the morning, and returning in the afternoon.

Wildlife
Due to the insular and oceanic nature, terrestrial fauna is limited and presents a high degree of endemism. Only a single species of frog (Leptodactylus insularis) and a single species of terrestrial turtle (Geochelone carbonaria) have been found. Two species of snakes (Boa constrictor imperator and Leptotyphlops magnamaculata), 6 of saurians, 10 of birds, 4 of sea turtles and a few of mammals have also been reported.

Climate

References

Providencia Island, Colombia
Populated places in the Archipelago of San Andrés, Providencia and Santa Catalina
Port cities in Colombia